Juku Pent (20 November 1918 – 16 October 1991) was an Estonian-born cross-country skier who competed for West Germany in the 1950s. He finished 26th in the 50 km event at the 1952 Winter Olympics in Oslo.

Pent was born in Jäneda, Lääne-Viru County, Estonia.

References

External links
Olympic 50 km cross country skiing results: 1948-64
Biography at esbl.ee

1918 births
1991 deaths
People from Tapa Parish
Olympic cross-country skiers of Germany
Cross-country skiers at the 1952 Winter Olympics
German male cross-country skiers
Estonian male cross-country skiers
Estonian emigrants to Germany